Phymata pennsylvanica, known generally as the Pennsylvania ambush bug or Pennsylvania jagged ambush bug, is a species of ambush bug in the family Reduviidae. It is found in North America. It is known to prey on a common hoverfly, Syritta pipiens.

References

Further reading

External links

 

Reduviidae
Articles created by Qbugbot
Insects described in 1897